Cacique is a Venezuelan brand of rum first marketed in 1959. It is the best-selling rum in Venezuela and a leading exporter to other South American countries and Europe (notably Spain). The Cacique product lines are owned by Diageo, the largest multinational beer, wine and spirits company in the world.  The word "cacique" (a loan from Taíno or Arawak languages) means "chief of the tribe" in Spanish.

It comes in several varieties, starting with the simplest Cacique Origen and then moving up to the Cacique 500. The most expensive is the Cacique Antiguo.

External links
 Cacique webpage

Rums
Venezuelan brands
Venezuelan rum
Diageo brands